Espejo Lake (Spanish for Mirror Lake) is a lake of glacial tectonic origin located in southern Neuquén Province, Argentina. The lake lies near the town of Villa La Angostura, on the route known as the Road of the Seven Lakes.

Its name refers to the clean and quiet waters, which reflect the landscape like a mirror. The lake is fed by numerous streams bringing snow- and ice-melt from the nearby mountains. The shore of the lake alternates between volcanic sand beaches, juncus, and rock walls.

Among the most common activities in the area are mountain biking, sport fishing, windsurfing, trekking, and BMX riding.

External links
Picture

Lakes of Neuquén Province
Glacial lakes of Argentina